Warren E. Thompson is an author of military history, specializing in aviation and the Korean War.  He has written for Osprey Publishing.

Bibliography
 (with David R. McLaren) MiG Alley-Sabres vs. MiGs Over Korea. Specialty Press, 2002.   
 F-80 Shooting Star Units over Korea. Oxford: Osprey Aviation, 2001.  
 Bandits Over Baghdad: Personal Stories of Flying the F-117 Over Iraq. Specialty Press, 2000.   
 F-84 Thunderjet Units over Korea.  Oxford: Osprey Aviation, 2000.  
 F-86 Sabre Fighter-bomber Units over Korea.  Oxford: Osprey, 1999.  
 F-51 Mustang Units over Korea.   Oxford: Osprey, 1999.  
 P-61 Black Widow Units of World War II. Botley: Osprey, 1998.   
 F-86 Sabres of the 4th Fighter Interceptor Wing. Oxford: Osprey, 2002.  
 B-26 Invader Units Over Korea. Oxford: Osprey, 2000.

References

External links

Living people
American military writers
American military historians
American male non-fiction writers
Year of birth missing (living people)